Kenneth Miller is an American television producer.

Early life

Miller was born in Chicago, Illinois on May 28, 1952. As a child, his family moved to Los Angeles, where Miller began learning the guitar. As a child, he aspired to become a filmmaker and work in the film and music industry.

Career

Miller is best known for his career as a television producer. He began working for Spelling Television in 1979 as a writer, eventually becoming the company's senior vice president. After 27 years working closely with Aaron Spelling, Spelling Television was purchased by CBS, and operations were discontinued. During his time with Spelling, Miller edited and produced and was instrumental in the success of some of television's longest running series such as Dynasty, Melrose Place, Beverly Hills 90210, 7th Heaven and Charmed. He has produced and executive produced 12 Soundtrack Albums, several of which were certified gold and platinum by the RIAA. Miller is a noted speaker at UCLA, USC, and as a Microsoft "campus" speaker, frequently lecturing on the new media.

Filmography

Television

References

1952 births
Living people
American television producers